Archibald, Archie or Arch Macdonald, MacDonald or McDonald may refer to:
 Sir Archibald Macdonald, 1st Baronet (1747–1826), British lawyer and politician
 Archibald Macdonald (Canadian politician) (died 1872), politician in Upper Canada
 Archibald MacDonald, Governor of British Honduras during the 19th century
 Archibald MacDonald, 7th of Dunnyveg (fl. 1560), clan chief of Clan MacDonald of Dunnyveg
 Archibald McDonald (1790–1853), Hudson's Bay Company fur trader
 Archibald McDonald (Canadian politician) (1849–1933), merchant and politician in British Columbia, Canada
 Archibald John Macdonald (Prince Edward Island politician) (1834–1917), merchant and politician in Prince Edward Island, Canada
 Archibald John Macdonald (1876–1938), merchant and politician in Ontario, Canada
 Archie Macdonald (1904–1983), Scottish businessperson and politician
 Archie MacDonald (wrestler) (1895–1965), British Olympic wrestler
 Arch McDonald (1901–1960), American radio broadcaster for the Washington Senators
 Arch MacDonald (1911–1985), Boston based American broadcast journalist
 Arch McDonald (footballer) (1882–1932), Australian rules footballer
 Archibald McDonald (Australian politician) (1872–1962), South Australian politician
 Archie MacDonald, a fictional character in the BBC TV series Monarch of the Glen

See also